Hallmark Business Connections, formerly Hallmark Business Expressions is a subsidiary of Hallmark Cards, headquartered in Kansas City, Missouri. Hallmark Business Connections targets businesses who use greeting cards. The company specializes in creating custom business greeting cards.

Company history
Hallmark Business Connections was launched in August 2005 and offers  personalized business greeting cards.

Environmentally friendly greeting cards
Connectionslaunched a collection of environmentally friendly holiday business greeting cards on July 18, 2008. The Green collection features nine card designs.  Each card in the collection is printed on stock consisting of 50 percent sugar cane pulp and 50 percent recycled paper.

Charity cards
On October 9, 2008, Hallmark Business Connections launched a line of business holiday cards that benefit four national charities – Boys & Girls Clubs of America, Feeding America, March of Dimes, The Salvation Army and Americares.  The new line features eight new card designs, with 20 percent of the net proceeds from each sale going to the charity selected by the customer.

References

External links
 Connections

Companies established in 1996
Companies based in Missouri
Privately held companies based in Missouri
Retail companies of the United States
Hallmark Cards